Thyagaraya Nagar, commonly known as T. Nagar, and historically known as East Mambalam, is a very affluent commercial and residential neighbourhood in Chennai, Tamil Nadu, India. It is surrounded by Nungambakkam in the North, Teynampet in the East, Nandanam in the South-East, C.I.T. Nagar (a part of Greater Nandanam region) in the South and West Mambalam and Kodambakkam in the West. The stretch between Duraiswamy Road and T. Nagar Bus Stand has some of the costliest real estates in Chennai. It was constructed between 1923 and 1925 by the Madras Presidency government of the Raja of Panagal as a part of town planning activities initiated according to the Madras Town Planning Act of 1920. The town was named after P. Thyagaraya Chetty. The streets, parks and localities in the new neighbourhood were named after important officials in the provincial government.

T. Nagar is believed to be the first planned urban neighborhood in Chennai created in 1920, conceived in a European style, with the Panagal Park resembling the Arc De Triomphe and the Pondy Bazaar resembling the Champs-Élysées in Paris.
Initially built as a residential neighbourhood, it is now considered the largest shopping district in India by revenue. It is known for its plethora of saree and jewellery retailers, including Pothys, Nalli Silks and Saravana Stores. The neighbourhood is served by Mambalam railway station of the Chennai Suburban Railway Network. T. Nagar is considered one of the city's major central business districts, the other being Parry's Corner, the centre of the city. Pondy Bazaar serves as a satellite commercial hub for T. Nagar, located around the Thyagaraya Road.

Location and geography

T. Nagar is located about 10 km from Chennai Airport and about 8 km from Chennai Central railway station. It lies to the west of the arterial Anna Salai (Mount Road) and is loosely bordered by Saidapet to the south and southwest, West Mambalam to the west, Kodambakkam to the northwest, Nandanam to the south, Nungambakkam to the north, and Teynampet to the east. T. Nagar is usually associated with Mambalam, a common name for the entire area of Thyagaraya Nagar, West Mambalam, C.I.T. Nagar and Pondy Bazaar. Panagal Park is located at the centre of the neighbourhood connecting five vein-roads of the neighbourhood: North Usman Road, South Usman Road, G.N. Chetty Road, Thyagaraya Road and Venkatanarayana Road.

History

Until the turn of the 19th century, the villages to the west of Mount Road formed a part of Chingleput District. The Long Tank, which formed the western frontier of the city, was drained out in 1923. That very same year, the administration of the Mambalam zamindari, situated to the west of the Long Tank, was relinquished by its hereditary chief. The region had several paddy fields. During 1923–25, the township of "Thiyagaraya Nagar" named after Sir P.T. Thyagaraya Chetty was carved out of the southern part of the erstwhile Mambalam zamindari. A park was developed at the centre of this new locality and was named in honour of the then Chief Minister, as Panagal Park. Soon afterwards, Pondy Bazaar began to make its appearance. According to historian S. Muthiah, it was initially known as 'Soundarapandia Bazaar' after Justice Party politician W. P. A. Soundarapandian Nadar. A well-planned residential area was created. Most of the streets in the new locality were named after provincial cabinet ministers, Justice Party bosses or officials in the administration.

The laying of suburban railway line from Egmore to Kancheepuram in 1911 resulted in a station at Mambalam. The first bank of the locality was opened in 1935, followed by a second one, the Indian Bank, in 1937. Retail industry started proliferating in the region with the establishment of Nalli Chinnasami Chetty's textile showroom in 1928, which was upgraded as the first Kancheepuram silk sari shop of the area in 1935. During the Second World War, the city was evacuated due to the fear of Japanese bombing. All the shops were closed and the economic activity was halted for a few days that followed.

The reason behind the naming of Pondy Bazaar still remains controversial. According to one version, Devaraj Mudaliar of Pondicherry opened 10 shops on Sir Thyagaraya Road and started calling it Pondy Bazaar. Madras historian S. Muthiah, in his book Madras Rediscovered, claims that the area was originally known as Soundarapandia Bazaar, which the government retained without change. Save for two of the streets, which were named after two workmen, Nagamani and Govindan, who died while digging trenches for the new drainage system in the locality, all the tree-lined streets were named after the stalwarts of the then ruling Justice Party.

Star-rated hotels started appearing in the locality with the opening of a three-star hotel named Residency in 1991. As of 2006, there were seven hotels with over 80 per cent occupancy rates. Some of the well established and popular restaurants are Hotel Saravana Bhavan, Adyar Ananda Bhavan, Mansuk, etc., With the increase in retail activities in the neighbourhood, several famous theatres such as Sun, Nagesh, and Rajakumari have given way to commercial complexes.

From its early days, Thiyagaraya Nagar remained one of the most preferred residential localities in the city. The population grew exponentially during the 1930s. In its early days, film artists such as M. K. Thyagaraja Bhagavathar, T. R. Rajakumari, N. S. Krishnan, Vyjayanthimala, N. T. Rama Rao, Thangavelu, Manorama, Savitri, Sivaji Ganesan and T. S. Balaiah set up their residences here.

Demographics
T.Nagar's bazaars are frequented by a number of shoppers. On a typical weekend, the number of people who move about on Pondy Bazaar, the locality's principal commercial area, might soar up to 500,000. During festival season, because of the discounts and reductions offered by dealers of silk sarees and jewellers, this number might reach 2 million. Even on a lean day, about 200,000 pedestrians traverse the roads around Panagal Park, the central part of the neighbourhood.

Economy

Thyagaraya Nagar is one of the busiest shopping districts of Chennai. The neighbourhood is considered to be the biggest shopping district in India by revenue. There are a number of apparel, jewellery and utensil stores based in Thiyagaraya Nagar. By some estimates, the shops in the neighbourhood together accounts for revenues of nearly  20,000 crores annually. However, official estimates put it much lower at over  10,000 crores, which is still double that of New Delhi's Connaught Place and Mumbai's Linking Road which account for about  4,000 to 6,000 crores annually. The neighbourhood accounts for about 70 to 80% of the gold sold in Chennai, the most important gold market in South India. Usman Road is the costliest commercial stretch in Chennai. The area around Panagal Park is known for its high-end textile shops, chiefly dealing with silk sarees, and jewellery stores. As of 2006, the real estate prices were  11,500 per sq.ft. Wardrobes stores Nalli Chinnasamy Chetti, Naidu Hall and Instore are based in Theagarya Nagar. Other important wardrobe stores such as Pothys, The Chennai Silks, RmKV Silks and Kumaran Silks and also have their showrooms in Theagarya Nagar. Retail giant Saravana Stores has a wardrobe showroom and an utensils showroom in Thiyagaraya Nagar. Ranganathan Street is one of the most crowded roads for pedestrian traffic during day time. The road is full of big name establishments side-by-side smaller and petty shops that sell all sorts of household goods and garments.

It also houses one of the biggest private lending libraries in the city, 'Raviraj Lending Library' on Usman Road.

Culture
T.Nagar offers a variety of entertainment options. It has grown to become a major hub for the Carnatic music festival-season, with a number of sabhas (such as Krishna Gana Sabha, Vani Mahal and Bharath Kalachar) hosting famous performers.

It also has a number of parks, cricket grounds, and other recreational facilities. The RKM Cricket Ground adjoining GN Chetty Road hosts division IV and V city-league games.

Society
T. Nagar residents are an unusual mix of the traditional and the modern and this is reflected in the way the neighbourhood has been growing. Several new eateries have come up while at the same time, traditional restaurants are also packed. With the city extending its bed-time more every year, the locality has acquired a reputation of always being in the fast lane. The grand textile showrooms close very late at night, and their hoarding boards constantly illuminate the roads.

Early in the morning, joggers and walkers take full advantage of the empty roads, with the fresh air that's so hard to come by in this area at all other times of the day. Panagal Park, Natesan Park and Jeeva Park all have their regular crowd and their walkers' associations are extremely active. T. Nagar is also a place of musical intellects. A lot of sabhas are very active during the month of December.

Religion

Hinduism 

Below is a list of some of the well-known Hindu temples located in T. Nagar:

 Sri Balaji Temple: This temple, located at Venkatanarayana Road, is run by the Tirumala Tirupati Devasthanam. It has a replica of Lord Venkateswara of Tirupati.
 T. Nagar Sringeri Saradha Peetam Temple: This temple, located at Venkatanarayana Road, is managed by the Sringeri Sharada Peetham Mutt. The temple has a large prayer and meditation hall
 Krishnan Koil (meaning "Krishna temple" in Tamil): A temple dedicated to Lord Krishna, located at South West Boag Road
 Sri Sakthi Vinayagar Temple, located at South Dhandapani Street
 Agastiyar temple, located at Raja Street
 Shiva-Vishnu temple, located near T. Nagar bus depot
 Krishna Raghavendra Mutt: Run by Udipi Pejawar Mutt, and located at Raghaviah Road
 Muppathamman temple: An Amman temple located at Maharajapuram Santhanam Salai

Jainism 
Shantinath Jain temple on G. N. Chetty Road is one of the most important Swetambar Jain temples in Chennai.

Christianity 
In the Roman Catholic Church, T. Nagar constitutes a parish, headed by the Holy Cross Church located in South Boag Road (now, Chevalier Shivaji Ganesan Road) under the jurisdiction of the Archdiocese of Madras-Mylapore. There is a Missionaries of Charity convent named Shishu Bhavan situated opposite to  the church. The convent was inaugurated by Mother Teresa herself. Located on Thyagaraya Road in Pondy Bazaar, is the FMM Convent of the Holy Angels. This convent houses Our Lady's Nursery and Holy Angels Anglo Indian Higher Secondary School. T. Nagar also has Protestant churches like CSI Kingdom of God's church, Canaan Evangelical Church et.c

Islam 

Some of the notable mosques include the Anjuman Mosque.

Parks

Being one of the centrally located neighbourhoods with both residential and commercial activities, T. Nagar has several parks and greeneries, many of which are maintained by the Corporation of Chennai. The 8-acre Panagal Park is the most prominent park in the locality with all the six arterial streets of the neighbourhood, namely, North Usman Road, South Usman Road, G. N. Chetty Road, Sir Thyagaraya Road (Pondy Bazaar), Venkatanarayana Road, and Doraiswamy Road, converging into it. The 4-acre Dr. Natesan Park, opened in 1950, is another well-known park located on Venkatanarayana Road. It is the only corporation-maintained park that has a separate tennis court for coaching children. Jeeva Park is another well-maintained park in the neighbourhood. These parks are popular spots for morning walks for the local residents.

Neighbourhood newspapers
T.Nagar Times - Covers local news from T. Nagar and surrounding localities, and is circulated free of cost every Sunday

Transport

Bus

T. Nagar is easily accessible from most parts of the city by bus. The T. Nagar bus terminus off Usman Road is a hub for services operating via the commercial district, including routes to Thiruverkadu, Mylapore, Kodambakkam, Avadi, Nungambakkam, Parry's Corner, Ennore, Manali, Tambaram, Poonamallee, Thiruvanmiyur, Ambattur, Pattabiram, Annanagar and Tiruvallur. There are also routes to various places in neighbouring Kanchipuram and Thiruvallur districts.

The T. Nagar bus terminus is spread around 1.95 acres and is located on South Usman road. On a daily basis 58 buses are operated from the terminus, besides 238 buses from other areas that pass through the terminus every day. The average frequency of buses at the terminus is 7 buses per minute.

Other important bus stops in T.Nagar are Panagal Park, Pondy Bazaar, Power House, and Vani Mahal.

Education
T. Nagar is home to
CDN Thyagaraya Nagar Higher Secondary School (founded 1933)
Ramakrishna Mission
Sir Mutha Venkatasubba Rao School
Padma Seshadri Bala Bhavan Senior Secondary school (T.P.Road Branch - From Pre-KG to 8th grade)
Holy Angels higher secondary school for girls
Sri Sankara Bala Vidyalaya Hr. Sec. School
T.Nagar High School
Shrine Vailankanni Sr. Sec. School
Vidyodaya Schools
Karnataka Sangha school
MCN School

There are a number of private libraries with vast collections of books.

Personalities associated with localities in T. Nagar
Most of the streets, landmarks and bazaars in T. Nagar have been named after administrators and politicians of the Justice Party.

 Thyagaraya Nagar, Sir Thyagaraya Road - named after Theagaraya Chetty
 Dr. Nair Road - named after Dr. T. M. Nair
 Panagal Park - named after the Raja of Panagal
 Natesan Park - named after C. Natesa Mudaliar
 Arcot Street - named after Twin brothers of Arcot -  Arcot Ramaswamy Mudaliar & Arcot Lakshmanaswami Mudaliar.
 Thanikachalam Road - named after O. Thanikachalam Chetti
 Sivagnanam Road -  named after T. N. Sivagnanam Pillai
 North and South Usman Road - named after Sir Mohammad Usman
 North and South Boag Road - named after G. T. Boag.
 Habibullah Road - named after Sir Muhammad Habibullah.
 G. N. Chetty Road - named after Gopathi Narayanaswami Chetty.
 Pondy Bazaar - Named after W. P. A. Soundarapandian Nadar.
 Burkit Road - Named after H. H. Burkitt.
 Raghavaiah Road - named after T. Raghavaiah.
 Bazullah Road - named after Muhammad Bazullah
 Mellony Road (originally Molony Road) - named after J. C. Molony
 Venkatanarayana Road - named after J. Venkatanarayana Naidu
 Basudev Road - named after C. Basudev
 Vijayaraghava Road - named after T. Vijayaraghavacharya

Politics

State assembly politics

T. Nagar is known for voting against the trend, voting against the winning party, on 5 separate occasions, since 1962 assembly elections. It has also become a critical swing constituency since it has become increasingly closer in recent years. It is worth noting that in the 2006 election, AIADMK was able to significantly increase their vote share, winning with a margin of 10.8%. This is mostly due to the high satisfaction of the J.Jayalalithaa government from 2001 to 2006, due to significant development that took place in that time period in the T. Nagar area.
 Note: In 1989, AIADMK was split between Janaki faction and Jayalalithaa faction, and only the Jayalalithaa faction is reported in the AIADMK column since they were the highest vote-gainers from the divided faction. The Janaki faction got 8,268, which is about 7.2% of the voters.

Lok Sabha politics
T. Nagar assembly constituency is part of Chennai South (Lok Sabha constituency).

Pedestrian plaza
A  338-million pedestrian plaza was planned in 2013 by the city corporation. It involves provision of a pedestrian-friendly footpath on the 1.45 kilometre-long stretch of the Theyagaraya Road between Panagal Park and Anna Salai. It will cover 1,450 metres of Thyagaraya Road from Bashyam Road near Panagal Park to Anna Salai. The plaza will be divided into three stretches with different identities. A 12-metre wide pedestrian space will be developed in the 730-metre stretch from Panagal Park to the Thanikachalam Road junction.

Upon completion, only city buses and motorcycles will be permitted in this area in a 7-metre carriageway. All types of vehicles will be allowed on the 370-m stretch from Thanikachalam Road to the Boag Road junction, where the pedestrian plaza will be only 3.5  metres wide and carriageway will be comparatively wider measuring 15  metres. All vehicles will be permitted on the 350-metre stretch between the Boag Road junction to the Anna Salai junction.

The proposal for a cycle track has been replaced with a plan to introduce battery-operated cars. A multi-level car parking lot has also been planned. Other facilities in the plaza include seating, public toilet and a children's play area.

Future
In 2013, to address the traffic concerns of the neighbourhood, Chennai Corporation tied up with real estate advisory firm Jones Lang LaSalle to exercise a proposal to redevelop the area, especially the shopping centres. T. Nagar will also be the site for the Smart City Mission in Chennai as per the Government data.

See also

 Shopping in Chennai
 Economy of Chennai
 Kannammapet
 Pondy Bazaar

Location in context

References

Neighbourhoods in Chennai
Shopping districts and streets in India
Retailing in Chennai
Cities and towns in Chennai district